Christian Knappmann (born 19 March 1981) is a German former professional footballer who played as a forward

References

External links

1981 births
Living people
Footballers from Düsseldorf
German footballers
Association football forwards
Kickers Offenbach players
3. Liga players
Regionalliga players
VfR Neumünster players
TuS Koblenz players
KFC Uerdingen 05 players
FC Gütersloh 2000 players
SC Verl players
Rot Weiss Ahlen players
SV Wacker Burghausen players
Wuppertaler SV players
Borussia Dortmund II players
Rot-Weiss Essen players
TSV Havelse players
SC Westfalia Herne players
German football managers
SC Westfalia Herne managers